Mayor Island / Tūhua is a dormant shield volcano located off the Bay of Plenty coast of New Zealand's North Island.

Geography

Approximately 18,000 years ago during the Last Glacial Maximum when sea levels were over 100 metres lower than present day levels, Mayor Island / Tūhua was connected to the rest of New Zealand. Sea levels began to rise 7,000 years ago, separating Mayor Island / Tūhua from the mainland. Hot springs abound, and there are two small crater lakes, Green Lake and Black Lake. These lie within two overlapping calderas formed in explosive eruptions 36,000 and 6,340 years ago.

Geology
Mayor Island is characterised as a peralkaline volcano and has exhibited a wide range of eruptive styles, including fire fountains, Strombolian explosions, extrusion of lava domes, phreatomagmatic explosions, Plinian falls and ignimbrite. The most recent lava flows have been dated at between 500 and 1,000 years old.

The Tūhua Caldera formed in the > eruptive volume event of 6,340 years ago and also is a partial collapse crater. The Tuhua Tephra is quite distinctive and due to it having two dispersion patterns has been found in the Auckland area where it is up to 7cm thick, at Rotorua up to 10cm thick and Lake Waikaremoana where it is 4cm thick, making it useful as a mid-Holocene marker horizon. It has also been characterised from multiple sea bed cores off the East coast from the Havre trough off the Bay of Plenty to the southern North Island off Cape Turnagain. 

Te Paritu Tephra is assigned to a Mayor Island eruption  but the full recent significant eruptive sequence required sea cores as prevailing winds are off land.
In summary recent eruptions are:

Risks
The island would likely be sterilised in a typical major pyroclastic eruption at their current frequency of about every 7,000 years although a small eruption could be confined within the caldera. Tsunami activity and ash affecting the Bay of Plenty are possible with initial vent clearing and ash falls toward the major cities of the northern half of the North island being most likely in summer, with economic disruption to especially ports and airports. Usually however the ash fall will be away from land.

History

Captain James Cook called it Mayor Island when he sighted it on 3 November 1769, in recognition of the Lord Mayor's Day to be held in London a few days later.

The Ngāti Whakaue led a military expedition to the island in 1842, after a tribesman was killed by the Whanau a Tauwhao, a hapu of Ngāi Te Rangi

The island is considered special by Māori (the indigenous people of New Zealand) partly because of the presence of black obsidian, a volcanic glass created by the rapid cooling of silica-rich lava, prized as a cutting tool. The obsidian was called Tūhua by Māori, who called the island by the same name. Over 80% of obsidian excavated from Matakawau on Great Mercury Island had been sourced from Tūhua. Several pa sites are known on the island, the final of which was inhabited until 1901.

Uses and recreation 

The area of the Bay of Plenty around the island is renowned for game fishing, with marlin, mako sharks, and swordfish all inhabiting the surrounding waters. Some of the island and the waters close to its shores, however, are now a small marine reserve. There are several tramping tracks around the island, and it is also popular with divers. Mayor Island today is a wildlife refuge. A small number of holiday houses are located in Opo Bay on the south coast of the island. The 2001 census showed a population of three, after zero in 1996 and 12 in 1991 (all figures randomised for privacy on a Base-3 system).

See also
 List of islands of New Zealand
 List of volcanoes in New Zealand

References

External links 

 Mayor Island Geology, by B.F. Houghton, C.J.N. Wilson, S.D. Weaver, M.A. Lanphere, and J. Barclay.
 Global Volcanism Program: Mayor Island
 There is a comprehensive article on Mayor Island in the New Zealand Geographic Magazine, number 3, July–September 1989.

Islands of the Bay of Plenty Region
Shield volcanoes of New Zealand
Calderas of New Zealand
VEI-5 volcanoes
Volcanic crater lakes
Volcanic islands of New Zealand
Polygenetic shield volcanoes
Volcanoes of the Bay of Plenty Region
Whakatane Graben
Pleistocene calderas
Holocene calderas